The 1955 Western Reserve Red Cats football team represented Western Reserve University—now known as Case Western Reserve University—during the 1955 college football season as a member of the Presidents' Athletic Conference (PAC). It was the inaugural season for the conference. Western Reserve was coached by Edward L. Finnigan and led by senior quarterback Flory Mauriocourt and fullback Hal "Candy" Carroll.

Schedule

References

Western Reserve
Case Western Reserve Spartans football seasons
Western Reserve Red Cats football